The Lone Star Alliance (LSA) is a lacrosse-only athletic conference affiliated with the Men's Collegiate Lacrosse Association (MCLA). The conference incorporates teams in Texas, Oklahoma, Louisiana, Arkansas, Kansas, Missouri, and Nebraska and is divided into three divisions, Division I, Division II, and Division III.

Teams
Seven institutions currently make up the LSA Division II. All of the LSA DI members are members of NCAA Division I. Currently the LSA DI league includes two Big 12 members, three SEC members, one Sun Belt Conference member, and one American Athletic Conference member. Ten institutions currently make up the LSA Division III. The league comprises members of various NCAA collegiate athletic conferences.

Former Members

Championship Records

Division I 

Note: From 1976 to 1990 the LSA was known as the SWLA (South Western Lacrosse Association)

Division II

References

External links
LSA website
Official MCLA website

College lacrosse leagues in the United States